Piotr Badura (born 20 February  1995) is a Polish volleyball player, a member of Poland men's national under-21 volleyball team and Polish club Stal AZS PWSZ Nysa.

Career

Clubs
In 2014 debuted in PlusLiga as PGE Skra Bełchatów player. On 8 October 2014 his team won ENEA Polish SuperCup 2014. In 2015 went to first league team Stal AZS PWSZ Nysa.

Sporting achievements

Clubs

National championships
 2014/2015  Polish SuperCup2014, with PGE Skra Bełchatów
 2014/2015  Polish Championship, with PGE Skra Bełchatów

National team
 2013  European Youth Olympic Festival
 2013  CEV U19 European Championship
 2013  FIVB U19 World Championship

References

External links
 SMS PZPS Spała player profile
 PlusLiga player profile

1995 births
Living people
People from Tomaszów Mazowiecki
Sportspeople from Łódź Voivodeship
Polish men's volleyball players
Skra Bełchatów players